Chris Eric Thomas (born July 16, 1971) is a former American football wide receiver in the National Football League.  He played for the San Francisco 49ers, the Washington Redskins, the St. Louis Rams, and the Kansas City Chiefs. 

He played college football at Ventura College and then California Polytechnic State University. At Cal Poly, Thomas majored in English and was a preseason Harlon Hill Award candidate in 1992. Although he played sparingly his final year of NCAA football due to injuries, he launched his pro career by signing with the then-San Diego Chargers in May 1993.

References

1971 births
Living people
Sportspeople from Burbank, California
Players of American football from California
American football wide receivers
Cal Poly Mustangs football players
San Francisco 49ers players
Washington Redskins players
St. Louis Rams players
Kansas City Chiefs players
San Diego Chargers players